The Red Run Covered Bridge or Oberhaltzer's Covered Bridge is a covered bridge that once spanned the Muddy Creek in Lancaster County, Pennsylvania, United States.  It was built in 1866 by Elias McMellen and is currently situated on private property next to the Red Run Campground.  It is 107 feet long with a width of 15 feet and is also known as the Oberholzer's Covered Bridge.

The bridge has a single span, wooden, double Burr arch trusses design.  It is painted red, the traditional color of Lancaster County covered bridges, on the outside.  Both approaches to the bridge are painted in the traditional white color.

The 107 foot long Red Run Covered Bridge is located at Red Run Campground and is on private property but it can easily be seen from the road. Built in 1866, this covered bridge is being used as a storage unit, this could be called a covered bridge to nowhere because the waters of Muddy Creek were diverted around the covered bridge in such a way that no water flows under its peers, another reason why this could be called a covered bridge to nowhere is because this covered bridge was replaced with a concrete span in 1961, a landlocked covered bridge is an ominous sight, and it can be imagined ghosts haunt here on Halloween.

The bridge's WGCB Number is 38-36-10.  Added in 1980, it is listed on the National Register of Historic Places as structure number 80003539.  It is located at  (40.17617, -76.08333).

Dimensions 
Length: 107 feet (32.6 m) length or 128 feet (39 m) total length
Width:  15 feet (4.6 m) total width

Gallery

See also

Burr arch truss
List of Lancaster County covered bridges

References 

Covered bridges in Lancaster County, Pennsylvania
Bridges completed in 1866
Covered bridges on the National Register of Historic Places in Pennsylvania
1866 establishments in Pennsylvania
National Register of Historic Places in Lancaster County, Pennsylvania
Road bridges on the National Register of Historic Places in Pennsylvania
Wooden bridges in Pennsylvania
Burr Truss bridges in the United States